"If It Happens Again" is a song and single written and performed by British group, UB40.  
It was featured on their album Geffery Morgan and was released in 1984 reaching 9, on the UK charts, staying for eight weeks. It also made 9 on the Irish charts and 8 on the Dutch charts.

The song was written as the group's response to Margaret Thatcher's Conservative Party's victory in the 1983 UK election.  It contains the lines "If it happens again I'm leaving, I'll pack my things and go... I won't say I told you so" and is considered a protest song of the time.

Charts

Weekly charts

Year-end charts

References

1984 songs
UB40 songs
Protest songs
Reggae songs